The National Institute of Astrophysics, Optics and Electronics (in Spanish: Instituto Nacional de Astrofísica, Óptica y Electrónica, INAOE) is a Mexican science research institute located in Tonantzintla, Puebla.

Founded by presidential decree on November 12, 1971, it has over 100 researchers in Astrophysics, Optics, Electronics and Computing Science, with postgraduate programs in these areas. INAOE is one of 30 public research centers sponsored by the National Council of Science and Technology of Mexico (CONACyT).

The Institute, in partnership with the University of Massachusetts Amherst, developed the Large Millimeter Telescope / Gran Telescopio Milimétrico on the Puebla-Veracruz border.

The asteroid 14674 INAOE was named after this institute.

Structure 
There are four departments with a number of research groups and laboratories:

 Astrophysics (José Ramón Valdés Parra)
   Visible Astronomical Instrumentation Laboratory and of High Energies (Esperanza Carrasco-Licea)
   Millimeter Wavelength Instrumentation Laboratory
   Fourier Spectroscopy Laboratory (Fabián Rosales)
   Photographic Plates Collection (Raquel Díaz Hernández)
Computer Sciences (Ariel Carrasco Ochoa)
Machine Learning and Pattern Recognition
Natural Language Processing 
Computer Perception
System Engineering
 Electronics (Alfonso Torres Jacome)
 Microelectronics
 Integrated Circuit Design
 Electronic Instrumentation
 Communications
Optics (Fermín Granados Agustín)
Science Group and Optoelectronics Engineering (CIOE)
Image-Science Group and Digital Color
Photonics
Optics Instrumentation
Quantum Optics
Diffractive Optics
Optoelectronics
Imaging Science
Biophotonics
Optical Communications and Optoelectronics
Optic Fibers 
Holography
Imaging and Digital Color
Optical Instrumentation
Optical Microscopy and Dimensional Metrology
Diffractive Optics
Biomedical Optics
Thin-films

See also
 University of California High-Performance AstroComputing Center

References

Research institutes in Mexico
Astrophysics institutes
Universities and colleges in Puebla
Postgraduate schools in Mexico
1971 establishments in Mexico